Shelkanovo (Şalqan) is a rural locality (a selo) in Mayadykovsky Selsoviet, Birsky District, Bashkortostan, Russia. The population was 576 as of 2010. There are 8 streets.

Geography 
Shelkanovo is located 32 km southwest of Birsk (the district's administrative centre) by road. Akkainovo is the nearest rural locality.

References 

Rural localities in Birsky District